Michael Mehl (born 5 February 1999) is a Canadian squash player and coach. He reached a career high ranking of 309th in the world in July 2015.

References

1999 births
Living people
Canadian male squash players
Sportspeople from Calgary
21st-century Canadian people